The Assembly of the African Union, which is formally known as the African Union Assembly of Heads of State and Government (AU-AHSG), is one of several decision-making bodies within the African Union. The other bodies are the Pan-African Parliament; the Executive Council, consisting of foreign ministers of the AU members states; and the African Union Commission. The Chairperson of the Assembly has few formal functions, the most important of which is to preside at the Pan-African Parliament during the election and swearing in of the President of the Pan-African Parliament.

History of the Assembly
The Assembly came into existence on 25 May 1963, as part of the ratification of Organization of African Unity (OAU). Initially the Assembly consisted of 32 independent members, the heads of state of the African states that had achieved independence by 1963. Until 2001, the governing constitution of the Assembly was the OAU Charter. The Assembly is now subject to the Union Act that created the African Union.

Functions of the Assembly
The Assembly has nine basic functions:
 Set policies of the Union.
 Decide on what action to take after consideration of reports and recommendations from the other organs of the Union.
 Consider membership requests into the Union.
 Create bodies for the Union.
 Monitor the implementation of policies and decisions of the Union as well ensure compliance by all Member States.
 Create a budget of the Union.
 Provide direction to the Executive Council on conflicts, war and other emergency situations and the restoration of peace.
 Select judges for and withdraw judges of the Court of Justice.
 Appoint the Chairman of the Commission, Commissioners of the Commission, all respective deputies and determine how long they will serve and what duties they will perform.

Decisions of the Assembly

The Assembly shall take its decisions by consensus or, failing which, by a two-thirds majority of the Member States of the Union. However, procedural matters, including the question of whether a matter is one of procedure or not, shall be decided by a simple majority.

Two-thirds of the total membership of the Union shall form a quorum at any meeting of the Assembly.

The Assembly may delegate any of its powers and functions to any organ of the Union.

Members of the Assembly
The AU Assembly of the Heads of State and Government consists of the 55 heads of state and government of the member countries. The Assembly meets once a year at the AU Summit. The current Chairman of the Assembly is President Cyril Ramaphosa of South Africa.

The current members of the AU-AHSG are:

See also
European Council, the European Union equivalent.

External links
 Assembly of the African Union Official Site

Organs of the African Union